The Provinciale Drentsche en Asser Courant was a regional newspaper in Drenthe, Netherlands, published in Assen from 1851 to 1966. It was a continuation of the Nieuws- en Advertentieblad voor de Provincie Drenthe (1823–1826) and Drentsche Courant (1826–1851). It was continued as the Drentse en Asser Courant (1966–1992) and Drentse Courant (1992–2002). In 2002 the Drentse Courant merged into the Dagblad van het Noorden, a shared newspaper for readers in the provinces Groningen and Drenthe.

History

1823–1851: Nieuws- en Advertentieblad and Drentsche Courant 
On 1 April 1823, the 'provincial printer' of Drenthe, Claas van Gorcum, started in Assen the publication of Nieuws- en Advertentieblad voor de Provincie Drenthe (Dutch for News and Advertisement Paper for the Province of Drenthe). First chief editor was Sibrand Gratama. The Nieuws- en Advertentieblad was renamed Drentsche Courant (Newspaper of Drenthe) in 1826.

1851–1966: Provinciale Drentsche en Asser Courant 
On 4 July 1851, the Drentsche Courant became the Provinciale Drentsche en Asser Courant (Newspaper of Drenthe Province and Assen). In 1869 frequency of publication increased to daily.

1966–1992: Drentse en Asser Courant 
In 1966 the Drents-Groningse Pers (Press of Drenthe-Groningen) was founded, as the result of organizational merger of the Emmer Courant and the Provinciale Drentsche en Asser Courant. The Drents-Groningse Pers continued publish the Emmer Courant and shortened its main daily into Drentse en Asser Courant. It added a new regional edition of the Drentse en Asser Courant, the Hoogeveense Courant. 

In 1975 Wegener acquired the Drents-Groningse Pers and in 1979 the Winschoter Courant was added to this company. Under Wegener, the Drentse en Asser Courant and the Emmer Courant continued to appear independently.

1992–2002: Drentse Courant 
In 1992 the Drentse en Asser Courant, the Emmer Courant, and the Hoogeveens Dagblad merged to form the Drentse Courant. In Groningen, the Winschoter Courant merged with its regional edition, De Noord-Ooster, into the Groninger Dagblad. The Drentse Courant and the Groninger Dagblad had the same layout and only differed from each other on the regional pages. 

In 1995 Hazewinkel Pers of Groningen, publisher of Nieuwsblad van het Noorden, acquired the Drents-Groningse Pers from Wegener. Initially, its three dailies continued to appear separately. In 2001, Hazewinkel Pers announced that it would merge its daily newspapers into Dagblad van het Noorden. As a consequence, since 2002 the province of Drenthe no longer has its own daily.

References 

1820s establishments in the Netherlands
2002 disestablishments in the Netherlands
Defunct newspapers published in the Netherlands
Dutch-language newspapers
Mass media in Drenthe
Publications established in 1991
Publications disestablished in 2002
Daily newspapers published in the Netherlands